This is the discography of Dutch DJ Oliver Heldens.

DJ mixes
 2020: Tomorrowland Around the World 2020: Oliver Heldens

Singles

As lead artist

As Hi-Lo

Guest appearances

Remixes

References

Electronic music discographies
House music discographies
Discographies of Dutch artists